Burgos Circle, also known as Padre Burgos Circle, is a traffic circle within the Bonifacio Global City in Taguig, Metro Manila in the Philippines. Developed as part of the Forbes Town Center mixed-use development developed by the Megaworld Corporation and named after martyred priest José Burgos of Gomburza, it serves as the intersection between Forbestown Road, 1st Avenue, 2nd Avenue, and 29th Street.

History
Burgos Circle was planned as part of the Forbes Town Center, a mixed-use development by the Megaworld Corporation inspired by Bugis Village in Singapore.

The circle first came to prominence in 2009, when it was identified as a new dining hotspot.  With a number of new restaurants opening in the area at the time, Burgos Circle was likened to Remedios Circle, Greenbelt 2, and Serendra as a new, up-and-coming hangout area, mostly catering to young professionals.

In 2013, columnist Stephanie Zubiri wrote in The Philippine Star that Burgos Circle was "a window to the Parisian lifestyle in the heart of Manila", owing to the area's walkability, its wide selection of restaurants, cafes and bars, and the availability of alfresco dining which reminded her of her time in Paris.

Structure
The center island of Burgos Circle forms a small park, Burgos Park. At the center of the park is a sculpture by Reynato Paz Contreras called The Trees, the first piece of public art to be installed in the Bonifacio Global City.  The bronze-and-brass piece was commissioned by the Bonifacio Art Foundation, which is responsible for maintaining the district's public art installations.

Representing the circle of life, the trees are a reminder of the progressive development and the preservation of Mother Earth, while the branches represent stability. More recently, the sculpture became a romantic place for couples to meet, and in 2016 it became a major landmark for those playing Pokémon Go in the area, with the game helping to boost foot traffic in the form of increased dining receipts days after it was first released in the Philippines.

During heavy rain, the basin retains water until it is emptied when the weather clears into creeks that flow to Manila Bay. Built during the initial development of the Bonifacio Global City at a cost of ₱60 million, and only one of two existing retarding basins in Metro Manila (the other located beneath the Magallanes Interchange), the basin has been credited for preventing flooding on both Epifanio de los Santos Avenue and Kalayaan Avenue.

References

External links

Landmarks in the Philippines
Roads in Metro Manila
Roundabouts and traffic circles in the Philippines
Buildings and structures in Taguig
Restaurant districts and streets in the Philippines